Chautauqua Hall is a historic building in Pacific Grove, California, United States. It was built in 1881 by the Pacific Improvement Company for the Pacific Grove Retreat Association for presenting concerts and entertainment. On July 20, 1970, the building was declared a California Historical Landmark #839. In 2022 the hall hosts classes and programs for the city. This facility is  Americans with Disabilities Act (ADA) compliant.

History

The Chautauqua Hall was built in 1881 by the Pacific Improvement Company for the Pacific Grove Methodist-Episcopal Camp Retreat for seven years (1881-1888). It is located on the southwest corner of 16th Street and Central Avenue. It was called a "Hall in the Grove," and later became known as Chautauqua Hall. The wood-framed structure has a gable roof and board-and-batten siding. The hall served as a location for hosting the annual Chautauqua Recognition Day ceremonies. During the summer months, the large meeting hall provided a place for public lectures, and two classrooms for Sunday school services. During the winter months, the building served as a storage facility for the campground tents.

The hall dates to the days when Pacific Grove was the western headquarters for the Chautauqua Movement. The Chautauqua Literary and Scientific Circle (CLSC) established a western branch at Pacific Grove in June 1879. Sunday school teachers of the local Methodist Church used the hall as a summer training camp. Known worldwide as 'Chautauqua-by-the-Sea,' it made Pacific Grove a cultural center for adult Christian education.

In 1883, Mary EB Norton instructed a course in general botany during the summer assembly. She had a place to house the Assembly's natural history collection. She held two sessions daily at the Chautauqua Hall.

In 1884, Carrie Lloyd opened a summer school for children in the hall. In 1885, the Pacific Grove School District was formed and classes were held in the hall for several years, until the Methodist Episcopal Church and Assembly Hall was built on Lighthouse Avenue in 1888.

By 1890, thousands of visitors came, via the Southern Pacific Railroad and the Pacific Steamship Company, to Pacific Grove's Chautauqua Methodist meetings. Orator and politician William Jennings Bryan, and William Rufus Shafter the "hero of Santiago," were among the guests that visited the Chautauqua Hall.

In 1898, the Epworth League, of the Methodist young adult association, came to Chautauqua Hall in the summertime. The California Methodist Conference, Farmers' Institute, The Salvation Army, and YMCA also came to the hall. John H. Vincent, founder of the Chautauqua movement, came for a visit to the hall and said, "The Hall in the Grove is the center of our charmed circle."

On July 20, 1970, the State Department of Parks and Recreation & City of Pacific Grove erected a landmark marker Number 839 at the Chautauqua Hall in Pacific Grove. The marker says:

The hall has been restored in 1988 and 2005. Today, the building is used as a dance hall, with a three-piece band.

See also 
 California Historical Landmarks in Monterey County
 Pacific Grove Museum of Natural History

References

External links 

 City of Pacific Grove, Chautauqua Hall
 California Historical Landmarks in Monterey County

Buildings and structures in Monterey County, California
California Historical Landmarks
Methodism in California
1881 establishments in California